The Lycée français international Samuel Beckett, formerly Lycée Français d'Irlande, is a French international school organisation in Dublin, Ireland. It has two units, a pre- and primary school division, covering from maternelle (preschool and infant classes) and elémentaire (junior classes), in a building on Foxrock Avenue in Foxrock, and a secondary school, comprising collège (junior cycle secondary) and lycée (senior cycle secondary), at the Eurocampus in Clonskeagh, shared with St. Kilian's Deutsche Schule, to which they moved in 2001.

Alumni
 Nicolas Roche - cyclist

References

External links

   (in French and English)

Dublin
Private schools in the Republic of Ireland
Primary schools in Dún Laoghaire–Rathdown
Secondary schools in Dún Laoghaire–Rathdown
International schools in the Republic of Ireland
Clonskeagh